This list is of the Cultural Properties of Japan designated in the category of  for the Prefecture of Yamanashi.

National Cultural Properties
As of 1 September 2015, twelve Important Cultural Properties (including two *National Treasures) have been designated, being of national significance.

Prefectural Cultural Properties
As of 1 May 2015, forty-seven properties have been designated at a prefectural level.

See also
 Cultural Properties of Japan
 List of National Treasures of Japan (paintings)
 Japanese painting
 List of Historic Sites of Japan (Yamanashi)

References

External links
  Cultural Properties in Yamanashi Prefecture

Cultural Properties,Yamanashi
Cultural Properties,Paintings
Paintings,Yamanashi
Lists of paintings